Admissions is a 2011 American short film written by John Viscount and directed by Harry Kakatsakis. The film received funds from a successful Kickstarter campaign.

The plot of the film revolves around an Israeli couple and a Palestinian man who go through admissions together because they have suffered similar tragic endings. The three are placed in an admissions room for the afterlife and must plead their case before the clerk (James Cromwell).

Cast
James Cromwell as The Clerk
Anna Khaja as Daphna
Oren Dayan as Ahmad
Anthony Batarse as Eli
Lindsey Ginter as Man in Suit
Heath Brown as Man in Hoodie

Filmmakers
Harry Kakatsakis, Director
John Viscount, Writer/Producer
Gavin Behrman, Producer

Awards
Artivist Film Festival
Artivist Spirit Award, Best Short Film - 2012
Uppsala International Short Film Festival
Best Children's Film - 2012
Woods Hole Film Festival
Winner - Jury Award, Best Narrative Short - 2012
Winner - Audience Award, Best Dramatic Short - 2012
Cleveland International Film Festival
Honorable Mention - Audience Choice, Best Short Film Award - 2012
Garden State Film Festival
Winner - Best Short Narrative - 2012

External links

References

2011 films
American drama short films
2011 short films
2011 drama films
Israeli–Palestinian conflict films
Kickstarter-funded films
2010s English-language films
2010s American films